German submarine U-69 was the first Type VIIC U-boat of the German Navy (Kriegsmarine) during World War II. This meant that compared to previous U-boats, she could travel further afield for longer, with a payload of fourteen torpedoes, an  deck gun for smaller vessels and a flak gun for use against aircraft. Her most notable attack was on the civilian ferry , which sank off the coast of Newfoundland in October 1942, killing 137 men, women and children.

Design and construction
German Type VIIC submarines were preceded by the shorter Type VIIB submarines. U-69 had a displacement of  when at the surface and  while submerged. She had two shafts and two  propellers.

U-69 was fitted with five  torpedo tubes (four fitted at the bow and one at the stern), fourteen torpedoes, one  SK C/35 naval gun, 220 rounds, and one  C/30 anti-aircraft gun. The boat had a complement of between forty-four and sixty sailors.

She was built at the Germaniawerft in Kiel during 1940, and was ready for service in November. After her warm up in the Baltic Sea (designed to give her an opportunity to train and repair minor faults), she was deployed into the Atlantic Ocean in February 1941.

Service history

First patrol
U-69 departed Kiel for her first patrol on 10 February 1941. Her route took her across the North Sea, through the gap between the Faroe and Shetland Islands and into the Atlantic Ocean.

No survivors were picked up, even though the crew were seen to reach the lifeboats.

The boat was attacked twice by a Sunderland flying boat on the 22nd – no damage was sustained.

U-69s next victim was Empire Blanda, sunk on the 19th.

The submarine was depth charged for three hours by the escorts of convoy OB 288 on 24 February. She escaped without any damage and docked at Lorient on the French Atlantic coast on 1 March.

Second patrol
The boat's second foray was to the mid-Atlantic. She sank Coultarn southwest of Iceland on 30 March. She then attacked and damaged Thirlby, which had been en route from St. Johns, Newfoundland to Hull. This weapon was a dud. (The ship was further damaged by a bomb from a German aircraft on 10 April).

U-69 returned to Lorient on 11 April.

Third patrol
The boat's next sortie was to the West African coast. She laid mines off Lagos and Takoradi and made full use of the failure of the allies to enforce convoy systems.

The sinking of Robin Moor caused President Roosevelt to brand Germany an "international outlaw" and to require Germany and Italy to close all of their consulates in the United States except for their embassies. Before the sinking, Robin Moors passengers and crew were allowed thirty minutes to board lifeboats, then the submarine torpedoed, shelled and sank the ship. The survivors then drifted without rescue or detection for up to eighteen days. When news of the sinking reached the US, few shipping companies felt truly safe anywhere. As Time magazine noted in June 1941, "if such sinkings continue, US ships bound for other places remote from fighting fronts, will be in danger. Henceforth the US would either have to recall its ships from the ocean or enforce its right to the free use of the seas." In October 1941, federal prosecutors in the espionage case against a group of 33 defendants known as the "Duquesne Spy Ring" adduced testimony that Leo Waalen had submitted the sailing date of Robin Moor for radio transmission to Germany, five days before the ship began her final voyage. Waalen was found guilty and sentenced to 12 years in prison for espionage and a concurrent 2-year term for violation of the Foreign Agents Registration Act.

Her master was awarded the OBE for his actions, but never knew about it; he was lost when Newbury went to the bottom on 15 September.

She then sank Sangara in Accra harbour on 31 May 1941. (The vessel was salvaged in 1943 and her cargo sold, she was broken up in 1947).

Robert Hughes was lost to a mine laid by U-69 on 4 June.

On the return journey, U-69 was engaged in what was an ultimately successful gun-duel with Robert L. Holt southwest of the Canary Islands on 3 July 1941. She fired 102 high explosive and 34 incendiary rounds from her deck gun, 220 rounds from her 20mm anti-aircraft weapon and 400 rounds from her MG 34 machine gun at the merchantman.

The boat returned to France, to St. Nazaire on 8 July.

Unfortunately for the crew of U-69, it was nearly a year before they sank another ship, due to the tightening of convoys in the second half of 1941 and some frustratingly short patrols, called off because of mechanical failure or sickness on the boat.

Fourth and fifth patrols
Patrol number four was relatively short, lasting barely a week and hardly leaving the Bay of Biscay.

U-69s fifth patrol took her northwest of St. Nazaire towards Greenland; although longer, it was also unsuccessful.

Sixth and seventh patrols
The boat's sixth patrol was uneventful.

During her seventh outing, she was depth charged for several hours by escorts of a convoy on 21 March, west of Ireland. She escaped without any damage.

Eighth patrol
U-69 added to her tally when she sank the tiny four-masted sailing vessel James E. Newson off the United States' seaboard with her guns. She sank a further three ships that month, making use of the "Second Happy Time" to add to her score.

On one of them, Lise, the first mate, the Norwegian Hangar Lyngås, survived a total of four torpedoings.

Ninth patrol and SS Caribou
Easily the most controversial action by U-69 was the destruction of the civilian ferry  in the Cabot Strait at 3:21 a.m. Atlantic Summer Time, on 14 October 1942. The submarine had been in the area for a few days, and sank the SS Carolus the day before, with the loss of eleven lives. Early that morning, Caribou was spotted, primarily because her coal-fired steam boilers emitted a long solid black smoke trail, and was silhouetted against the phosphorescent sky. While sitting in wait on the surface, Gräf launched one torpedo, which hit. The stricken vessel's boilers exploded soon after being hit, and the ship sank in approximately five minutes, trapping most of the crew and passengers in the ship.

Caribou departed North Sydney, Nova Scotia, on 13 October 1942, heading for its home port Port aux Basques in Newfoundland.

Controversy surrounded HMCS Grandmères actions immediately after the sinking in the local Cape Breton Island media. Instead of searching for the survivors right away, she engaged the U-boat in combat, almost ramming her, and firing six depth charges. Grandmère pursued U-69 for close to two hours, then turned back to look for survivors. During this time, some survivors of the sinking died from exposure in the cold Atlantic. As noted in a dispatch a few weeks later by the Flag Officer of the Newfoundland Force, Commodore H. E. Reid, Grandmère was following normal operational doctrine by going after the submarine, and not stopping to pick up survivors. If she had stopped, she would likely have been sunk as well by U-69.

In all 57 military personnel, 31 merchant seamen and 49 civilians — including many women and children — were killed in the sinking, totalling 137 persons lost (most were trapped in the ship, and drowned). The sinking was also one of the few times that military censorship was immediately lifted, in an attempt to prevent rumours and speculation. The sinking made news across North America that week and was used effectively as a rallying cry for Victory Bond campaigns. The sinking was possibly the most significant in Canadian and Newfoundland waters, not because of Caribous tactical importance; but rather, the U-boat war was on display to Canadians and Newfoundlanders on their home front.

Tenth patrol and loss
On 17 February 1943, while operating with wolf-pack Haudegen, U-69 was involved in an attack on convoy ONS 165 in the middle of the North Atlantic. Located by HF/DF and radar, she was forced to the surface by depth charges and then rammed by the destroyer . None of her 46 crew survived the sinking.

Emblem
U-69 was unusual in that she had two ships' emblems. The first, adopted on commissioning, was chosen by her first commander, Metzler. This consisted of the word Horrido (Tally-Ho) and the three two-flag signal groups for the letters L M A (a reference to Gotz von Berlichingen’s famous retort). The second came about when the 7th flotilla adopted Prien's bull emblem as its flotilla insignia. U-69s new first officer, who had not seen the insignia before, found a picture of a cow on a French cheese box, and had that painted on the conning tower, complete with the motto on the box "" (the laughing cow). When Metzler saw it, he decided to keep it, as it raised a laugh with all who saw it, and the crew adopted the slogan as a war-cry; U-69 thereafter became known as the "laughing cow".

Wolfpacks
U-69 took part in seven wolfpacks, namely:
 Seewolf (4 – 15 September 1941)
 Brandenburg (15 – 24 September 1941)
 Störtebecker (5 – 19 November 1941)
 Gödecke (19 – 25 November 1941)
 Letzte Ritter (25 November – 3 December 1941)
 Falke (8 – 19 January 1943)
 Haudegen (19 January – 15 February 1943)

Summary of raiding history

References

Bibliography

External links

German Type VIIC submarines
World War II submarines of Germany
Ships built in Kiel
1940 ships
U-boats commissioned in 1940
U-boats sunk in 1943
U-boats sunk by British warships
U-boats sunk by depth charges
Ships lost with all hands
World War II shipwrecks in the Atlantic Ocean
Maritime incidents in February 1943